Robert Suter Clack  (June 13, 1850 – October 22, 1933) was an English born professional baseball player outfielder who played with the Brooklyn Atlantics and the Cincinnati Reds from  to . He also served as an umpire for five games in 1876.

References

External links

1850 births
1933 deaths
Brooklyn Atlantics players
Cincinnati Reds (1876–1879) players
Major League Baseball players from the United Kingdom
Major League Baseball players from England
English baseball players
19th-century baseball players
Major League Baseball umpires
Binghamton Crickets (1870s) players
Utica (minor league baseball) players